Parnoy-en-Bassigny is a commune in the Haute-Marne department in north-eastern France.

Parnoy-en-Bassigny was created with the merger of Parnot and Fresnoy-en-Bassigny.

See also
Communes of the Haute-Marne department

References

Parnoyenbassigny